BND may refer to:

Organisations
 Federal Intelligence Service (Germany), the foreign intelligence agency of Germany
 Bank of North Dakota, a state-owned and -run financial institution, based in Bismarck, North Dakota, USA
 Belleville News-Democrat, a newspaper in Belleville, Illinois, USA
 Bulgarian New Democracy, a Bulgarian centre-right political party
 VID (company), a Russian TV company
 Business & Decision (stock ticker: BND), a consulting company
 Banco Nacional de Desarrollo, the national development bank, for banking in Nicaragua
 National Digital Library of Moldova; part of the National Library of Moldova

By codename
 Brunei dollar, currency of the Sultanate of Brunei, by ISO 4217 code
 Banda language (Maluku) (ISO 639 language code: bnd), found in Indonesia
 Brandon railway station (National Rail station code: BND), Suffolk, England, UK
 Bandar Abbas International Airport (IATA airport code BND; ICAO airport code: OIKB), Bandar Abbas, Hormozgan Province, Iran

Other uses
 Buy Nothing Day, an international day of protest against consumerism
 BTEC National Diploma, a further-education qualification in most of the United Kingdom
 "BND", a song on the album No Doubt by No Doubt
 Bnd, short for "Bend"; a Street suffix as used in the US

See also

 
 Band (disambiguation)
 Bend (disambiguation)
 Bind (disambiguation)
 Bond (disambiguation)
 Bound (disambiguation)
 Bund (disambiguation)